The Indoor Shooting Range in Ramankulangara, Kollam is the largest automated indoor air-conditioned shooting range in Kerala state. The range is owned by Kollam district Rifle Association(KDRA). It was inaugurated by Kollam Mayor V. Rajendrababu on 29 July 2017. The shooting range was established to train 1,000 students from Kollam district to qualify for the National Games. ₹10,000 is the annual training fee.

Facilities
 Automated firing target card
 10 shooters at a time
 Airtight firing chamber

Reference

Indoor arenas in Kerala
Indoor arenas in India
Sports venues in Kollam
Sports venues completed in 2017
2017 establishments in Kerala